Juwenalia (Polish, from Latin Iuvenalia - Juvenalia) is an annual higher education students' holiday in Poland, usually celebrated in May, before the summer exams, sometimes also at the beginning of June.

The first Juwenalia were celebrated in the 15th century in Cracow. Juwenalia are celebrated in all colleges in Poland, with different names depending on a school or a city. At Medical Academies, they are called Medykalia, at Academies of Economy - Ekonomalia. At the University of Warmia and Mazury in Olsztyn, they are called "Kortowiada", at the University of Opole they are called Piastonalia, at the Silesian University of Technology in Gliwice - Igry, at the Gdańsk University - Neptunalia, at the University of Zielona Góra - Bachanalia.

Juwenalia start with a triumphant parade of colorfully dressed students. The participants march from a college's campus to the city's main square, where in a symbolic gesture, the mayor of a city hands keys to the city's gates to the students. The three days are free from lectures and filled with concerts, parties, sports events as well as drinking.

See also
 Culture of Kraków

References 

May observances
Student culture
Polish traditions
Youth culture in Poland
Education in Poland
Annual events in Poland